Krupnykh (from крупный meaning large) is a gender-neutral Russian surname.

References

Russian-language surnames